Bèze is a commune in the Côte-d'Or department in eastern France.

It takes its name from the Bèze river, which rises in the commune.

Population

See also
Communes of the Côte-d'Or department

References

External links

Official website

Communes of Côte-d'Or
Côte-d'Or communes articles needing translation from French Wikipedia